Stalking Head Creek is a stream in the U.S. state of Georgia. It is a tributary to Falling Creek.

The name "Stalking Head Creek" was applied to this stream for the local Native American custom of wearing camouflage masks when deer hunting. A variant name is "Stalkinghead Creek".

References

Rivers of Georgia (U.S. state)
Rivers of Jasper County, Georgia
Rivers of Jones County, Georgia